The Benjamin F. Turley House, near Sparta, Kentucky, is a Gothic Revival-style house built in 1865.  It was listed on the National Register of Historic Places in 1979.  The listing included two contributing buildings and a contributing site.

The house is a two-story brick Gothic Revival building built in 1865, on a fieldstone foundation.  It was extended by a one-story addition in 1938.  It has a distinctive enclosed porch with three Romanesque style arched openings.

References

Houses on the National Register of Historic Places in Kentucky
Gothic Revival architecture in Kentucky
Houses completed in 1865
National Register of Historic Places in Gallatin County, Kentucky
1865 establishments in Kentucky